Taranysh is a rural locality (a village) in Beryozovsky District, Perm Krai, Russia. The population was 10 as of 2010.

Geography 
Taranysh is located 18 km northeast of  Beryozovka (the district's administrative centre) by road. Martely is the nearest rural locality.

References 

Rural localities in Beryozovsky District, Perm Krai